By og land hand i hand (Town and Country Hand in Hand) is a 1937 Norwegian drama film written and directed by Olav Dalgard, starring Hans Bille and Lars Tvinde. The film was made by the Norwegian Labour Party for the 1937 local elections.

Plot
The wealthy landowner Hans Bjørnstad (Bille) is approached by his workers for a raise, but is shocked by their radical socialist ideas. Later he talks to another landowner, Nils Tveit (Tvinde), who is more sympathetic to the workers' case. Through conversations with family members in Oslo, the two realise the advantages Labour government has brought, and the necessity of cooperation between town and country for the prosperity of the country.

Cast
 Rønnaug Alten as Tora Larsen
 Hans Bille as Hans Bjørnstad, a farmer from Eastern Norway
 Kolbjørn Brenda as Anton
 Oscar Egede-Nissen as Ole Larsen, a speculator
 Hilda Fredriksen as the woman from Ullern
 Jens Holstad as Larsen
 Tryggve Larssen as Svart-Pelle
 Georg Løkkeberg as Georg Larsen, an engineer
 Ida Rothmann as Sonja, a working girl
 Toralf Sandø as Knudsen, a workshop foreman
 Gunnar Simenstad as Adolf, a construction worker
 Eva Steen as Katrina Larsen
 Lars Tvinde as Nils Tveit, a farmer from Western Norway

External links
 
 By og land hand i hand at the Norwegian Film Institute 

1937 films
1937 drama films
Norwegian drama films
Norwegian black-and-white films
Films directed by Olav Dalgard
1930s Norwegian-language films